Local elections were held in Las Piñas on May 13, 2013, within the Philippine general election. The voters elected for the elective local posts in the city: the mayor, vice mayor, one representative, and the councilors, six in each of the city's two legislative districts.

Background 
Incumbent Mayor Vergel "Nene" Aguilar was on his third and final term. His opponents were Conrado Miranda, Antonio Abellar Jr., Felix Sinajon, and Francisco "Kiko" Antonio Jr., son of former Mayor Francisco Antonio Sr.

Incumbent Vice Mayor Luis "Louie" Bustamante was on his second term. His opponents were former Councilor Benjamin Gonzales and Renato Santos.

Incumbent Representative Mark Villar was on his second term. His opponents were Luis "Louie" Casimiro and Filipino Alvarado.

Results

For Representative, Lone District 
Representative Mark Villar of the city’s lone district was reelected with 147,884 votes.

For Mayor 
Mayor Vergel "Nene" Aguilar won with 152,583 votes, a difference of 148,335 votes over his closest opponent, Conrado Miranda, who got only 4,248 votes.

For Vice Mayor 
Incumbent Vice Mayor Luis Bustamante won with a total of 136,744 votes.

For Councilor

First District 
Partial unofficial tally of all candidates and considerable winners.

|-bgcolor=black
|colspan=10|

Second District 
Partial unofficial tally of all candidates and considerable winners.

|-bgcolor=black
|colspan=6|

References

External links 
 https://www.goodfilipino.com/2013/05/elections-results-2013-in-las-pinas-city.html

Las Piñas
2013
2013 elections in Metro Manila